WRGW-LP (94.5 FM) is a radio station licensed to Shawano, Wisconsin, United States. The station is currently owned by Sacred Heart Educational Association.

References

External links
 

RGW-LP
RGW-LP